Samaran may refer to:
 Waray-Waray language
 Samaran, Gers, a commune of France in the department of Gers
 Samaran (film), a 2012 film